This is a season-by-season list of records compiled by Maine in men's ice hockey.

Maine has won two NCAA Men's Division I Ice Hockey Championships in its history, the most recent of which coming in 1999. In 1993 Maine set a record for wins in a season with 42, a record that still stands as of 2018.

Season-by-season results

Note: GP = Games played, W = Wins, L = Losses, T = Ties

* Winning percentage is used when conference schedules are unbalanced.^ Maine was forced to forfeit 13 games after the season for using an ineligible player.† Maine was forced to forfeit 14 games during the season for using an ineligible player.‡ Shawn Walsh was suspended for one year on December 22, 1995 as a result of NCAA investigations into his recruiting practices. Maine was also ineligible to participate in any playoff during the 1996–97 season.bold and italic are program records

Footnotes

References

 
Lists of college men's ice hockey seasons in the United States
Maine Black Bears